Roy Duane Ward (born May 28, 1964) is a former Major League Baseball relief pitcher who played with the Atlanta Braves and Toronto Blue Jays.

Ward went to school and made his early athletic mark in Farmington, New Mexico, a small oil and gas city, and one known for its amateur baseball programs. Ward thrived in the American Amateur Baseball Congress-sponsored baseball leagues and graduated from Farmington High School, home of the Scorpions. He was drafted out of high school in 1982. Ward also starred in the Connie Mack World Series, a baseball tournament for 18-and-under players that has been hosted in Farmington since 1965.

Since 1988, Ward has lived in Las Vegas, Nevada.

Early career
A hard-throwing pitcher, Ward was drafted with the ninth pick in the 1st round of the 1982 amateur draft by the Atlanta Braves. He is tied with Jim Kremmel (1971) for the second-highest draft pick of players hailing from New Mexico, behind shortstop Alex Bregman, who was selected with the second pick in the first round of the 2015 MLB draft. He made his major league debut on April 12, 1986, but after limited success was traded to the Toronto Blue Jays on July 6 for pitcher Doyle Alexander.

Setup man
Ward became one of the Jays' most dependable middle and late inning relievers in 1988, and remained in the role through the 1992 season, when the Blue Jays won their first World Series. His pitching repertoire featured a lively, mid-90s fastball and a hard slider.

Closer
After years of being in Tom Henke's shadow, Ward took over the closer's role in 1993. In the regular season, Ward set Toronto's single-season team record for saves with 45. He was tied with Jeff Montgomery of the Kansas City Royals for most saves in the American League. Ward was the closing pitcher for the American League in its 9–3 victory at the 1993 Major League Baseball All-Star Game.  In helping the Blue Jays repeat as World Series Champions in 1993 Ward reached the peak of his career and, unexpectedly, the last significant duty of his career.

In the 1993 World Series, Ward earned two saves over Philadelphia, in Game 1 (8–5 save, in Toronto) and in the wild Toronto 15–14 victory in Game 4 in Philadelphia, when Ward got the last four outs after Toronto scored the final six runs of the game. Ward was the winning pitcher for the decisive Game 6 in which Joe Carter hit a walk-off home run after Ward pitched in relief.

The rest of Ward's career was beset by injuries and he would never save another Major League game after 1993. After missing the entire 1994 season due to biceps tendinitis, he retired from the Toronto Blue Jays after pitching just four games during the 1995 season. He finished his career with a 3.28 ERA and 121 saves.

Broadcasting
Since 2014, Ward has been featured on the Blue Jays' radio broadcasts for Sportsnet 590 The Fan. He occasionally fills in for regular colour commentator Joe Siddall.

See also
 List of Major League Baseball annual saves leaders

References

External links

Major league pitching comes to Farmington: Hometown hero Ward, Eichhorn lead clinic (Farmington Daily Times article)

American expatriate baseball players in Canada
American League All-Stars
American League saves champions
Atlanta Braves players
Toronto Blue Jays players
Major League Baseball pitchers
Baseball players from New Mexico
1964 births
Living people
People from Farmington, New Mexico
People from the Las Vegas Valley
Gulf Coast Braves players
Anderson Braves players
Durham Bulls players
Greenville Braves players
Richmond Braves players
Syracuse Chiefs players
Dunedin Blue Jays players
Daytona Cubs players
Orlando Cubs players
Major League Baseball broadcasters
Toronto Blue Jays announcers
Canadian Baseball Hall of Fame inductees